Luxottica Group S.p.A. is an Italian eyewear conglomerate and the world's largest company in the eyewear industry. It is based in Milan, Italy. Its best known brands are Costa, Ray-Ban, Persol, Oliver Peoples and Oakley.

Luxottica is a vertically integrated company, which has been described as a monopoly—it designs, manufactures, distributes, and retails its eyewear brands through companies such as LensCrafters, Sunglass Hut, Apex by Sunglass Hut, Pearle Vision, Target Optical, and Glasses.com. It also owns EyeMed, one of the largest vision health insurance providers. Luxottica's market power has allowed it to charge price markups of 1000%.

Luxottica also makes sunglasses and prescription frames for designer brands such as Chanel, Prada, Giorgio Armani, Burberry, Versace, Dolce and Gabbana, Michael Kors, Coach, Miu Miu and Tory Burch.

In January 2017, Luxottica announced a merger with Essilor. The combined entity would command more than one quarter of global value sales of eyewear. In March 2018, the European Commission unconditionally approved the merger of Essilor and Luxottica. On 1 October 2018, the new holding company EssilorLuxottica was born, resulting in combined market capitalization of approximately $70 billion.

History 
Leonardo Del Vecchio started the company in 1961, in Agordo north of Belluno, Veneto; today the company is headquartered in Milan, Italy.

Del Vecchio began his career as the apprentice to a tool and diemaker in Milan, but decided to turn his metalworking skills to making spectacle parts. So in 1961, he moved to Agordo in the province of Belluno, which is home to most of the Italian eyewear industry. The new company was Luxottica s.a.s., a limited partnership with Del Vecchio as one of the founding partners. In 1967, he started selling complete eyeglass frames under the Luxottica brand, which proved successful enough that by 1971 he ended the contract manufacturing business.

Convinced of the need for vertical integration, in 1974, he acquired Scarrone, a distribution company. In 1981, the company set up its first international subsidiary, in Germany, the first in a rapid period of international expansion. The first of many licensing deals with a designer was struck with Armani, in 1988.

The company listed in New York in 1990, and in Milan in December 2000, joining the MIB-30 (now FTSE MIB) index in September 2003. The listing raised money for the company and allowed it to use its shares to acquire other brands, starting with Italian brand Vogue Eyewear in 1990, Persol and the United States Shoe Corporation (LensCrafters) in 1995, Ray-Ban in 1999 and Sunglass Hut, Inc. in 2001. Luxottica later increased its presence in the retail sector by acquiring Sydney-based OPSM in 2003, Pearle Vision and Cole National in 2004. Luxottica acquired Oakley in November 2007 for US$2.1 billion. Oakley had tried to dispute their prices because of Luxottica's large marketshare, and Luxottica responded by dropping Oakley from their stores, causing their stock price to drop, followed by Luxottica's hostile take over of the company. In August 2011, Luxottica acquired Erroca for €20 million. In March 2014, it was announced that Luxottica would partner with Google on the development of Google Glass and its integration into Luxottica's eyewear.

Essilor bought Daytona Beach, FL, based Costa, Inc. in 2013 brand of premium sunglasses was integrated into the Luxottica system in 2020.  The approximately $270 million all-cash transaction was 2.8 times Costa's revenues from continuing operations for the trailing 12 months – a very rich valuation that approaches what Oakley received when it was acquired by Luxottica during the height of the M&A market in 2007. Luxottica has shut down Costa's headquarters, warehousing and shipping operation in Daytona Beach. About 295 employees will be let go. Costa sunglasses will be manufactured at Luxottica's plant in Foothill Ranch, California.

On 1 September 2014, a new organizational structure was announced, composed of two co-CEOs, one focusing on market development and the other overseeing corporate functions. After the exit of former CEO Andrea Guerra, Enrico Cavatorta was appointed CEO of Corporate Function and Interim CEO of Market (until new and permanent appointment to this role). Cavatorta left the company 40 days after being appointed CEO. In 2016, it was reported that Luxottica had lost its third chief executive in a year and a half, as Adil Mehboob-Khan stepped down a year after he replaced Cavatorta.

In January 2017, the company agreed to a merger with Essilor. The deal also offered a succession plan for Leonardo Del Vecchio, the company's founder. Shortly before the merger completed, reporter Sam Knight wrote in The Guardian, "in seven centuries of spectacles, there has never been anything like it. The new entity will be worth around $50bn (£37bn), sell close to a billion pairs of lenses and frames every year, and have a workforce of more than 140,000 people." On 1 October 2018 the new holding company EssilorLuxottica was founded, resulting in combined market capitalization of approximately €46.3 billion as of the date of the merger announcement.

In August 2018, Luxottica restored Accademia Bridge in Venice.

Eyewear brands 

Luxottica's two main product offerings are sunglasses and prescription frames. The company operates in two sectors: manufacturing & wholesale distribution, and retail distribution.

The house brands include the following:

The company also makes eyewear under license for the following designer labels:

These brands are sold in the company's own shops, as well as to independent distributors such as department stores, duty-free shops, and opticians.

Retail 
Luxottica Retail has about 9,100 retail locations in the United States, Latin America, Canada, India, China, Australia, New Zealand, South Africa, the United Kingdom, and United Arab Emirates. The headquarters of the retail division is in Mason, Ohio, United States (North America). Their retail banners include the following:

Luxottica is the largest optical retailer in the United States, with 7.3% of US retail sales in 2015. With its merger with Essilor in 2018 the company owns Coastal/Clearly, an online contacts and glasses retail giant bought in 2014 that ships to over 200 countries beside its original North American market.

Medical managed care 
Luxottica also owns EyeMed Vision Care, a managed vision care organization in the United States. As of 2014, it is the second-largest vision benefits company in the United States.

Philanthropy 
Luxottica is affiliated with the charitable organization OneSight, formed in 1988. In March 2022, EssilorLuxottica announced the launch of the OneSight EssilorLuxottica Foundation to unify the group's philanthropic efforts, primarily providing vision services to underserved communities.

Criticism

Monopolistic pricing practices 
The company has been criticized for the high price of its brand-name glasses, such as Ray-Ban, Oakley, and several others. A 2012 60 Minutes segment focused on whether the company's extensive holdings in the industry were used to keep prices high. Luxottica owns not only a large portfolio of brands (over a dozen) such as Ray-Ban and Oakley but also retailers such as Sunglass Hut, Lenscrafters and Oliver Peoples, the optical departments at Target and Sears, as well as key eye insurance groups including the second largest glasses insurance firm in the US, EyeMed. It has been accused of operating a complete monopoly on the optical industry and overcharging for its products; for example, temporarily dropping then-competitor Oakley from its frame design list, then, when the company stock crashed, purchasing the company, then increasing the prices of its Ray-Ban sunglasses. In addition, it has been argued that, by owning the vision insurance company EyeMed, it also controls part of the buyers' market as well.

The company has said that the market is highly competitive, and that their frames account for ~10% of sales worldwide and ~20% in the United States. Euromonitor International estimated that Luxottica's market share was 14% worldwide, with the second-largest company in the industry, Essilor, holding a 13% market share. The third-largest player was Johnson & Johnson, with a 3.9% market share. In October 2018, Luxottica and Essilor merged into a single company, EssilorLuxottica, which now occupies nearly 30% of the global market share and represents almost a billion pairs of lenses and frames sold annually.

The HBO series Last Week Tonight with John Oliver has criticized the company as a prominent instance of corporate consolidation, as has the TruTV series Adam Ruins Everything.

In 2019, LensCrafters founder E. Dean Butler spoke to the Los Angeles Times, admitting that Luxottica's dominance of the eyewear industry had resulted in price markups of nearly 1,000%. In the interview, Butler noted "You can get amazingly good frames, with a Warby Parker level of quality, for $4 to $8. For $15, you can get designer-quality frames, like what you'd get from Prada." When told that some eyeglasses cost as much as $800 in the United States, Butler remarked, "I know. It's ridiculous. It's a complete rip-off."

Major shareholders 
The list of Luxottica shareholders with more than 2% of holdings, represented by voting shares at 23 December 2014.
 Delfin S.à r.l. 66.485%
 Deutsche Bank Trust Company Americas (as ADR depository) 7.466%
 Giorgio Armani 4.955%

In September 2012, Delfin S.à r.l. reduced its share of Luxottica from 66% to 62.1%, but later increased its share to 66% again.

See also 
Safilo

References

External links 
 

 
EssilorLuxottica
Eyewear brands
Eyewear retailers of Italy
Fashion accessory brands
High fashion brands
Luxury brands
2018 mergers and acquisitions
Conglomerate companies of Italy
Multinational companies headquartered in Italy
Companies based in Milan
Manufacturing companies based in Milan
Design companies established in 1961
Manufacturing companies established in 1961
Italian companies established in 1961
Companies formerly listed on the Borsa Italiana
Companies formerly listed on the New York Stock Exchange
Eyewear companies of Italy
Eyewear brands of Italy